George Henry Keerl (April 10, 1847 – September 9, 1923) was an American professional baseball player who played in six games for the Chicago White Stockings during the  baseball season.
He was born in Baltimore, Maryland and died in Menominee, Michigan at the age of 76.

External links

Baseball players from Baltimore
Chicago White Stockings players
1847 births
1923 deaths
Burials in Wisconsin
19th-century baseball players